Thabisio Ralekhetla (born 3 March 1960) is a Lesotho long-distance runner. He competed in the men's marathon at the 1996 Summer Olympics.

References

1960 births
Living people
Athletes (track and field) at the 1996 Summer Olympics
Lesotho male long-distance runners
Lesotho male marathon runners
Olympic athletes of Lesotho
Place of birth missing (living people)